The Worshipful Company of Leathersellers is one of the livery companies of the City of London. The organisation originates from the latter part of the fourteenth century and received its Royal Charter in 1444, and is therefore the senior leather industry-related City Livery Company.

The Leathersellers' Company ranks fifteenth in the order of precedence of livery companies. The company's motto is Soli Deo Honor et Gloria, Latin for Honour and Glory to God Alone.

Activities
The company, which originally regulated leather merchants, continues to act as an advocate for the UK leather trade, together with its leather-associated livery partners: Cordwainers, Curriers, Girdlers, Glovers and Saddlers. Like these other companies, today it is primarily involved in philanthropic, charitable and educational activities.

Schools
The livery company is very closely linked with the Leathersellers' Federation of Schools (formerly Prendergast School), now comprising Prendergast Ladywell School, Prendergast School and Prendergast Vale School, all located within the London Borough of Lewisham. Since the mid-seventeenth century the Company has also been closely associated with Colfe's School, today an independent co-educational school located at Lee, near Lewisham, London. In addition the Company supports and maintains its longstanding connection with the Institute for Creative Leather Technologies (now a part of the University of Northampton), successor to the college which the Company founded at Bermondsey in 1909 as Leathersellers' Technical College. The company continues to support higher education through exhibitions (grants) to university students, a practice which began in 1603 when four 'poor scholars', two at Oxford and two at Cambridge, were awarded five pounds and five shillings each per annum. Today around 100 students receive exhibitions which enable them to study at various universities.

Affiliations
The livery company is affiliated with the Royal Navy's submarine HMS Audacious, with 1st The Queen's Dragoon Guards and with 230 Squadron RAF.

Almshouses
Like many other livery companies, it has a long tradition of maintaining almshouses. The first almshouses run by the company were built circa 1543-44, close to Leathersellers' Hall, on a site behind St Ethelburga's Church and housed seven elderly people. In 1837 the Company also built almshouses at Barnet in north London. These were extended in the mid-nineteenth century. In 1866 it was decided to close the almshouses in the City and remove the residents from there to join those already at Barnet. The Company still maintains almshouses in the London Borough of Barnet, now known as Leathersellers' Close, which are home to about 20 residents and are managed by Harrison Housing on behalf of the Leathersellers' Barnet Charity.

Leathersellers' Hall 
The Company has had six previous halls in its history, and is now in its seventh hall, which was officially opened by the Earl of Wessex in May 2017. Its first hall was on London Wall but in 1543 the Company acquired the former Benedictine Convent of St Helen, off Bishopsgate, and the subsequent halls have all been on that site, now St Helen's Place. The fifth hall was destroyed in May 1941 during the London Blitz. The sixth hall was officially opened in 1960 and was demolished in 2011, though the façade of the building has been saved. The new, seventh hall, has been designed by Eric Parry RA.

References

External links
 The Leathersellers' Company

Livery companies
14th-century establishments in England
Organisations based in London with royal patronage
Corporatism
Companies of medieval England
Charities based in London